A landing ship, infantry (LSI) or infantry landing ship was one of a number of types of British Commonwealth vessels used to transport landing craft and troops engaged in amphibious warfare during the Second World War. LSIs were operated by the Royal Navy, British Merchant Navy, Royal Canadian Navy, Royal Indian Navy, and Royal Australian Navy. They transported British Commonwealth and other Allied troops in sea assaults and invasions throughout the war.

Typically, a landing ship, infantry would transport its cargo of infantry from its embarkation port to close to the coast to be invaded. This location (the "lowering position" in Royal Navy terminology) was approximately 6–11 miles off shore.  The troops would then transfer to landing craft, most commonly LCAs, for the journey to the beach. The landing craft would return to the LSI after disembarking their cargo and be hoisted up to embark additional troops.

Origins
In the years immediately before war was declared the Inter-Service Training and Development Centre sought to identify ships suitable to carry Army and Royal Marine formations being employed in amphibious operations. Such ships would not be purpose-built, but would be found within the lists of merchant marine vessels. These ships needed to be fast and have davits capable of lowering the new landing craft assault fully loaded with troops.  and her sisters, Glenearn, Glenroy, and Breconshire, then abuilding, were determined to be ideal for infantry landing ships. This class of four fast passenger and cargo liners were intended for the Far East trade route. The Admiralty acquired the four Glens shortly after their launchings, and converted them into fast supply ships. By June 1940, Glengyle, Glenearn, and Glenroy were under conversion to LSI(L)s. The Admiralty insisted on keeping Breconshire in a fast cargo configuration, so the ISTDC consulted the Director of Naval Construction about suitable requisitioned ships. Displacing approximately 3,000 gross registered tons and able to make 22 knots, these vessels could carry as many as 800 troops apiece. These were the original 5 LSIs. More LSIs would be found in the years to come from requisitioning or new construction provided by the United States under Lend-Lease.

Design and conversion
LSIs were grouped according to their troop capacity and endurance. Initially, all were requisitioned merchant vessels that exchanged carrying lifeboats for landing craft. During April and June 1940, the Glens underwent further conversion into LSIs capable of transporting an embarked force of up to 34 officers and 663 other ranks and carrying 12 LCAs on Welin-McLachan davits and 1 LCM(1) stored in chocks on deck and launched by 30-ton derricks.   Glengyle was built by Caledon Shipbuilding & Engineering Company, Dundee, for the Glen Line. The only vital alterations to the 18 knot Glengyle and her sisters, Glenroy and Glenearn, were to assure davits strong enough to lower fully loaded LCAs, and to provide accommodation for the army units to be transported. This latter alteration entailed introducing tables, forms, and posts for slinging hammocks into the former cargo hold. Glengyle, the first LSI, was accepted into service on 10 September and, on 31 January 1941, she sailed around Africa to the Mediterranean.

Smaller LSI, such as Queen Emma and Princess Beatrix,  were generally converted cross-channel ferries, or a converted passenger ship.

Conversion was accomplished, as with LSI(L), by adding davits for the landing craft, providing troop accommodation, plus some defensive armament, such as QF 12 pounder 12 cwt naval guns, and anti-aircraft guns, such as the 20 mm Oerlikon cannon.

They were reconfigured to carry 550 infantrymen transported in six LCAs and two LCM(1)s, and have large sick-bay facilities for the anticipated casualties. Their old  guns were replaced with two twin 4 inch mountings, two single Bofors 40mm guns, and ten Oerlikons. The rebuilding, which took place at Esquimalt and Vancouver, was completed in December 1943 and shortly after re-commissioning, she left for the United Kingdom via Panama canal and New York City, under Captain T.D. Kelly RCNR, (her final commanding officer) who had supervised the fitting-out of both ships. The ship's davits were capable of lifting an LCA which, by this time in the war, was approaching 14 tons.

In Australia in mid-1942,  was marked for conversion into the Royal Australian Navy's first landing ship, infantry at Garden Island Dockyard. Her armed merchant cruiser armament was removed and replaced with a single 12-pounder gun, six 40 mm Bofors, and eight 20 mm Oerlikons. The Walrus amphibian aircraft was removed, and the ship was modified to carry US manufactured landing craft: 17 LCVPs, and two LCM(3)s. Manoora was initially able to accommodate 850 soldiers, but later modifications increased this to 1,250. The ship was recommissioned on 2 February 1943 with the pennant number C77, and after spending six months on amphibious warfare training in Port Phillip, was deployed to New Guinea.

In the United States, a commercial hull was put in war production by the Maritime Commission; the  C1-S-AY1 subtype of thirteen ships built by the Consolidated Steel Corporation, were modified for use as LSI(L)s under lend-lease. These ships were all given two-word names beginning with "Empire", such as SS Empire Spearhead.  All were able to accommodate two LCA flotillas; a total of 24 craft. The  was lost during the invasion of Normandy to a mine.   was sunk by a U-boat torpedo on 28 December 1944. All these ships had davits fitted to accept LCAs and the other appropriate British manufactured landing craft for LSIs.

Normally British converted LSIs were fitted with heavy-duty power-operated davits. Early landing ships were fitted with Welin-McLachlin davits – these being generally in use in the Merchant Navy for standard 99 man lifeboats. As the weight of LCAs increased through the war (eventually approaching 14 tons) heavier davits were required. Later LSIs and those being refitted were provisioned with luffing davits of a crossbeam type. The davits themselves provided a demarcation between the responsibilities of the LSI crew (either Royal Navy or Merchant Navy) and the members of the LCA flotilla.

Manning the landing ship, infantry
Some of the LSIs were commissioned into the Royal Navy, received navy crews, and flew the White Ensign, while most retained their civilian crews and flew the Red Ensign. Royal Navy LSIs had Royal Navy landing craft flotillas assigned to them until 1943, when a proportion of landing craft flotillas were manned by Royal Marine crews. Merchant Navy LSIs would have Royal Navy gunners for the anti-aircraft equipment, and Royal Navy officers and ratings operating the ship’s flotilla of landing craft. Generally, these divisions of personnel did not cooperate or share in each other's work responsibilities.

LSIs in Royal Canadian Navy service were crewed by Canadians and, by late 1943 on, were assigned RCN landing craft flotillas. The crews intermingled, lent a hand as needed in one another’s work, and messed together.

Ship designations

Ships
  – Isle of Man Steam Packet Company passenger ferry. Served at Pointe du Hoc with 2nd US Rangers, 6 June 1944
 
 SS El Hind – hired as LSI(L) in 1943, destroyed by fire in Bombay docks, April 1944
 
 
  – LSI(L)
  
  – LSI(L)
 
  – LSI(L), 10,000 tons, 700 troops
 HMS Glenearn – LSI(L)
 HMS Glenroy – LSI(L)
  – LSI(S)
 
  – LSI(L), sunk off Algeria, 1942
  
 SS Llanstephan Castle - Union Castle Line, 11,293 GRT - sister ship of 
 
  – formerly an ocean-going passenger ship
 Belgian ferry SS Princesse Marie-José
 
  – LSI(M), 500 troops
  – LSI(M) former passenger liner
  – LSI(S), former Belgian cross channel ferry, torpedoed in 1944 by 
  – LSI(S)
  – LSI(M)
  – LSI(S)
 
  – LSI(M)
  – formerly Cape Argos then Empire Anvil
  – LSI(H), former passenger ferry operating in the Irish Sea
 
  – formerly Empire Crossbow
 HMS St Helier – LSI(H) former Channel Island ferry
  with LCP(L)s
  – LSI(H), former passenger ferry operating in the Irish Sea

See also

 Auxiliary personnel attack ship - US term for a similar ship
 Landing craft assault

Notes and citations

References 
Bruce, Colin J. Invaders, Chatham Publishing, London, 1999. 
 Bastock, John. Australia's Ships of War Sydney : Angus and Robertson Publishers, 1975. 
Buffetaut, Yves. D-Day Ships, Naval Institute Press, Annapolis, Maryland, 1994. 
Fergusson, Bernard. The Watery Maze; The Story of Combined Operations, Holt, New York, 1961.
Ladd, JD. Assault From the Sea: 1939–1945, Hippocrene Books, Inc., New York, 1976. 
Ladd, James D. Commandos and Rangers of World War 2, Macdonalds and Jane's, London, 1978. .
Ladd, JD. Royal Marine Commando, Hamlyn Publishing Group Ltd., London, 1982. 
Lavery, Brian. Assault Landing Craft, Seaforth Publishing, Barnsley, UK, 2009. 
Lund, Paul, and Ludlam, Harry. War of the Landing Craft, New English Library, London 1976. 
Maund, LEH. Assault From the Sea, Methuen & Co. Ltd., London 1949.
Saunders, Hilary A. St. George. Combined Operations: The Official Story of the Commandos, New York: Macmillan, 1943.
US Navy ONI 226. Allied Landing Craft and Ships, US Government Printing Office, 1944.

External links
http://www.naval-history.net/xGM-Chrono-40LSI-L-Royal%20Scotsman.htm
http://www.maritimequest.com/liners/02_pages/p/prince_leopold_1930_data.htm

Ship types
Troop ships
Amphibious warfare vessels
Military vehicles introduced in the 1930s